The African Judo Union (AJU) is the governing body of judo in Africa. It is one of the five continental confederations making up the International Judo Federation (IJF). AJU was formed on 28 November 1961 in Dakar (Senegal). JUA has headquarters in Dakar and consists of 52 member federations.

History
The African Judo Union was founded on 28 November 1961 in Dakar, Senegal under the name of Union Afro-Malgache de Judo (UAMJ). The first competitions were tha African Championships in 1964 in Dakar and the African Games in 1965 in Brazzaville.

Tournaments
 African Judo Championships
 African Games
 African Judo Championships for Juniors
 African Judo Championships for Cadets

Members
The 54 members of the AJU are:

 Algeria
 Angola
 Benin
 Botswana
 Burkina Faso
 Burundi
 Cameroon
 Cape Verde
 Central African Rep.
 Chad
 Comoros
 Congo
 Côte d'Ivoire
 DR Congo
 Djibouti
 Egypt
 Equatorial Guinea
 Eswatini
 Ethiopia
 Gabon
 Gambia
 Ghana
 Guinea
 Guinea-Bissau
 Kenya
 Lesotho
 Liberia
 Libya
 Madagascar
 Malawi
 Mali
 Mauritania
 Mauritius
 Morocco
 Mozambique
 Namibia
 Niger
 Nigeria
 Réunion
 Rwanda
 São Tomé and Príncipe
 Senegal
 Seychelles
 Sierra Leone
 Somalia
 South Africa
 South Sudan
 Sudan
 Togo
 Tunisia
 Uganda
 Tanzania
 Zambia
 Zimbabwe

References

External links
 

Africa
Sports governing bodies in Africa
Union
Sports organizations established in 1961
1961 establishments in Africa